An Earth god is a deification of the Earth associated with a figure with chthonic or terrestrial attributes.

In Greek mythology, the Earth is personified as Gaia, corresponding to Roman Terra. Egyptian mythology have the sky goddesses, Nut and Hathor, with the earth gods, Osiris and Geb.

Ancient Egyptian religion 
Geb, "God of Earth and Land"

Europe

Greek
Poseidon, one of the Twelve Olympians in ancient Greek religion and myth; god of the Sea and other waters; of earthquakes; and of horses

Slavic
Volos, Slavic god of earth, waters, and the underworld.
Troglav, deity in Slavic mythology whose three heads were believed to represent sky, earth and the underworld.

Asia

Sumerian
Šumugan, in Sumerian mythology, god of the river plains, given charge by the god Enki over the flat alluvial lands of southern Mesopotamia 
Nuska vizier of the chief Sumerian god Enlil but later associated with Nippur ("Enlil City") as the god of the earth 
Enten, Sumerian fertility deity identified with the abundance of the earth 
Enlil, ancient Mesopotamian god associated with wind, air, earth, and storms
Enki, Sumerian god, literal translation "Lord of the Earth"
Emesh, Sumerian god created at the wish of Enlil to take responsibility on earth for woods, fields, sheep folds, and stables

Levantine
Amurru, Amorite deity, occasionally called "lord of the steppe" or "lord of the mountain"

Hindu
Dharā Hindu Vasu god representing the earth and the element earth

Chinese

Chinese folk religion and Taoism
dìguān dàdì (Three Great Emperor-Officials), in Taoism and Chinese folk religion, "Emperor God of Earth and Land"
Tu Di Gong, in Taoism and Chinese folk religion, "God of Earth and Land"
Na Tuk Kong, in Taoism and Chinese folk religion of Malaysian Chinese - Peranakans and Chinese Indonesians, "Tutelary deity of Earth and Land"

Mahayana and Vajrayana 
Kṣitigarbha, "bodhisattva of Earth and Land"

Tai folk religion and Burmese folk religion
Phra Bhum Chaiya mongkol (พระภูมิชัยมงคล - Bhummaso), "Tutelary deity of Earth and Land" in Thailand, Cambodia, Laos and myanmar

Vietnamese 
Thổ Công, is the earth god who governs the land, each house; each piece of land will have its own Thổ Công.
Ông Tà, the god who governs the fields and gardens

Americas
Tezcatlipoca, Aztec deity associated with the earth, the night sky, the night winds, hurricanes, the north, obsidian, enmity, discord, rulership, divination, temptation, jaguars, sorcery, beauty, war and strife.
Trengtrengfilu, Mapuche god of Earth and Fertility 
Alignak, in Inuit mythology, a lunar deity, but also god of earthquakes, as well as  weather, water, tides, and eclipses
Aganju, in Cuba, is a volcano deity for the practitioners of the Lucumi, Santeria religion

Pacific Ocean
Rūaumoko, in Māori mythology, god of earthquakes, volcanoes and seasons.

Africa
Medr/Meder, Ethiopian, Aksumite, Earth god
Ratovantany, Malagasy deity that shaped humans from clay and takes their corpses after death

See also
Mother Earth
Earth in culture
Earth symbol

References